New York State Route 237 (NY 237) is a north–south state highway located in the western part of New York in the United States. The southern terminus of the route is at an intersection with NY 5 in Stafford. Its northern terminus is at an interchange with the Lake Ontario State Parkway immediately south of Lake Ontario in Kendall. NY 237 passes through mostly rural areas of Genesee and Orleans counties; however, it also passes through several small communities, including the village of Holley.

In the 1930 renumbering of state highways in New York, NY 237 was assigned to the portion of its modern alignment south of what is now NY 104 in Murray while the segment of modern NY 237 between current NY 104 and NY 18 was designated as New York State Route 385. NY 237 was extended northward to Kendall , replacing NY 385. It was extended northward once more in the early 1970s to meet the Lake Ontario State Parkway.

Route description

NY 237 begins at an intersection with NY 5 east of Batavia in the Genesee County town of Stafford. It heads northward from the hamlet of Stafford as Morganville Road, traversing open fields on its way to the hamlet of Morganville  to the north. Here, the route takes on a northeast alignment for a brief distance before resuming a northerly alignment as it exits the community. North of Morganville, NY 237 crosses open terrain and passes over the New York State Thruway (Interstate 90) ahead of an isolated junction with NY 33—which parallels the Thruway along this stretch—near the northern town line. The route continues north into the town of Byron and the hamlet of South Byron, a small community built up around the CSX Transportation-owned Rochester Subdivision. NY 237 quickly proceeds through South Byron, passing under the railroad line on its way toward the hamlet of Byron.

In the center of Byron, NY 237 meets NY 262, which becomes county-maintained as the eastern segment of County Route 13 (CR 13) east of NY 237. Past NY 262, NY 237 proceeds through the residential northern outskirts of the hamlet to Pumpkin Hill, the last community that NY 237 enters prior to crossing into Orleans County. Outside of Pumpkin Hill, the route passes through sparsely developed areas of Byron and Clarendon, serving the small hamlet of Honest Hill in the southern portion of the latter. NY 237 continues north to the hamlet of Clarendon, situated at the junction of NY 237 and NY 31A. At this point, NY 237 turns to follow a more northeasterly alignment toward the village of Holley, the largest community on NY 237. After another  of rural surroundings, the route enters the Holley village limits in the town of Murray, becoming South Main Street and turning back to the north upon passing under the Falls Road Railroad south of the village center.

The highway continues north along South Main Street for three blocks to the center of Holley, where it intersects NY 31 northwest of the village's business district. NY 237 continues on as North Main Street, passing by the Holley Central School District's elementary and high schools and crossing over the Erie Canal before exiting the mostly residential village. Now named North Main Street Road, NY 237 continues generally northward through rural portions of Murray to a junction with NY 104 (Ridge Road). NY 237 turns west here, following NY 104 for just under  to the hamlet of Murray, where NY 237 breaks from NY 104 and continues north into the town of Kendall as Kendall Road.

In Kendall, NY 237 heads north across mostly undeveloped areas to the vicinity of the town center, where it enters a more residential area as it meets NY 18 south of the hamlet of Kendall. NY 237 proceeds northward into Kendall itself, passing Kendall Elementary School and serving the community's center before continuing into another rural area of the town of Kendall. The route traverses another  of open fields toward the Lake Ontario shoreline, where NY 237 comes to an end at an interchange with the Lake Ontario State Parkway. Although NY 237 terminates here, Kendall Road continues northward for another  to serve a pair of lakeside communities.

History
NY 237 was assigned as part of the 1930 renumbering of state highways in New York to the portion of its current alignment south of then-NY 31 (now NY 104). At the same time, the portion of modern NY 237 between NY 104 and NY 18 was designated as NY 385. The NY 385 designation was short-lived, however, as it became part of an extended NY 237 . The route was extended again in the early 1970s to meet the Lake Ontario State Parkway at an interchange on the shoreline of Lake Ontario. This extension of NY 237 is maintained by Orleans County as CR 57A from NY 18 to Carr Road and as CR 70 north of Carr Road. Both county route designations are unsigned. While NY 237 ends at the parkway, CR 70 continues northward for an additional  to a dead end at Lake Ontario.

Major intersections

See also

List of county routes in Orleans County, New York

References

External links

Transportation in Genesee County, New York
Transportation in Orleans County, New York
237